Rhein Gibson (born 1 February 1986) is an Australian professional golfer.

Amateur career
Gibson was a four-time NAIA All-American at Oklahoma Christian University.

Professional career
Gibson made the cut at the 2014 Open Championship, where in the 3rd round he played in a group with Tiger Woods and Jordan Spieth.  Gibson ultimately finished in 72nd place.

In December 2014, he finished fourth in the Web.com Tour qualifying tournament to earn a place on the 2015 Web.com Tour.  In 2015 he finished 33rd in the regular season, then tenth (excluding the regular season Top 25) in the Web.com Finals to earn a place on the PGA Tour for 2015-16. 

Gibson finished 199th on the FedEx Cup and 30th on the Web.com Tour money list, but his PGA Tour season was highlighted by a double eagle on the par-5 18th at the Barracuda Championship, worth eight points under the tournament's Modified Stableford scoring system. The shot was worth $50,000 to a Nevada charity, plus $50,000 to a charity of Gibson's choice. Gibson chose Maximum Chances, the autism charity of tournament winner and countryman Greg Chalmers.

In January 2018, an incident involving Gibson and his temporary caddie Brandon Davis caused controversy. Playing in The Bahamas Great Abaco Classic on the Web.com Tour, Gibson was caught on camera throwing his putter headcover at Davis after the caddie had picked his ball up in a hazard – resulting in a one-stroke penalty.

World record
Gibson shot a 55 (−16) for a round of golf on 12 May 2012, at River Oaks Golf Club in Edmond, Oklahoma, setting a Guinness World Record.

Amateur wins
2008 Oklahoma State Amateur

Professional wins (5)

Korn Ferry Tour wins (2)

*Note: The 2019 BMW Charity Pro-Am was shortened to 54 holes due to rain.

Korn Ferry Tour playoff record (0–1)

NGA Tour wins (1)
2013 Avoca Classic

Other wins (2)
2010 Oklahoma Open
2013 Arkansas Open

Results in major championships

CUT = missed the half-way cut
"T" = tied

See also
2015 Web.com Tour Finals graduates
2019 Korn Ferry Tour Finals graduates

References

External links

Australian male golfers
Oklahoma Christian Eagles golfers
PGA Tour golfers
Korn Ferry Tour graduates
Golfers from Oklahoma
Sportsmen from New South Wales
1986 births
Living people